So Fresh: The Hits of Autumn 2005  is a compilation of songs that were popular in Australia in autumn 2005. It was released on 23 March 2005. The compilation was certified double platinum by the Australian Recording Industry Association (ARIA), denoting shipments of 140,000 copies.

Track listing 
 Jennifer Lopez – "Get Right" (3:45)
 Nitty – "Nasty Girl" (4:07)
 Destiny's Child – "Lose My Breath" (4:02)
 Nelly featuring Tim McGraw – "Over and Over" (4:14)
 Maroon 5 – "Sunday Morning" (4:02)
 Delta Goodrem – "Out of the Blue" (4:18)
 Kelly Clarkson – "Since U Been Gone" (3:09)
 Good Charlotte – "I Just Wanna Live" (2:46)
 Michael Gray – "The Weekend" (3:11)
 Lovefreekz – "Shine" (3:13)
 Deep Dish – "Flashdance" (3:15)
 Tammin – "Pointless Relationship" (3:24)
 Anthony Callea – "The Prayer" (4:13)
 JoJo featuring Bow Wow – "Baby It's You" (3:35)
 Natasha Bedingfield – "Unwritten" (3:38)
 Guy Sebastian – "Kryptonite" (3:59)
 Casey Donovan – "Listen with Your Heart" (4:00)
 Ashlee Simpson – "Shadow" (3:57)
 The Killers – "Mr. Brightside" (3:43)
 U2 – "Vertigo" (3:12)

Charts

Certifications

See also
So Fresh

References

External links
 Official site

So Fresh albums
2005 compilation albums
2005 in Australian music